Durah Sadat (also Romanized as Dūrāh Sādāt) is a village in Sarfaryab Rural District, Sarfaryab District, Charam County, Kohgiluyeh and Boyer-Ahmad Province, Iran. At the 2006 census, its population was 18, in 4 families.

References 

Populated places in Charam County